The Roman Catholic Diocese of Santa Cruz do Sul is a diocese located in the city of Santa Cruz do Sul in the Ecclesiastical province of Santa Maria in Brazil.

History
 20 June 1959: Established as Diocese of Santa Cruz do Sul from the Metropolitan Archdiocese of Porto Alegre

Bishops
 Bishops of Santa Cruz do Sul (Roman rite)
Alberto Frederico Etges † (1 Aug 1959 - 27 Jun 1986) Retired
Aloísio Sinésio Bohn (27 Jun 1986 - 19 May 2010) Retired
Canísio Klaus (19 May 2010 - 2016.01.20) Appointed Bishop of Sinop, Mato Grosso
Aloísio Alberto Dilli, O.F.M. (2016.07.13 - present)

Other priests of this diocese who became bishops
Paulo Antônio de Conto, appointed Bishop of São Luíz de Cáceres in 1991
Gílio Felício, appointed Auxiliary Bishop of São Salvador da Bahia in 1998

References
 GCatholic.org
 Catholic Hierarchy

Roman Catholic dioceses in Brazil
Christian organizations established in 1959
Santa Cruz do Sul, Roman Catholic Diocese of
Roman Catholic dioceses and prelatures established in the 20th century